Tantum or Lomba Tantum is a small settlement located in the southwest corner of the island Brava, Cape Verde. It is one of the southernmost settlements in Cape Verde, together with nearby Cachaço. Its 2010 population was 282.

References

Villages and settlements in Brava, Cape Verde